The following is a summary of the 2015–16 season of competitive football in Switzerland.

Men's national team
The home team is on the left column; the away team is on the right column.

UEFA Euro 2016

UEFA Euro 2016 qualification

Friendly matches

Women's national team
The home team is on the left column; the away team is on the right column.

UEFA Women's Euro 2017 qualifying

2016 UEFA Women's Olympic Qualifying Tournament

Friendly matches

League standings

Raiffeisen Super League

Brack.ch Challenge League

References

 
Seasons in Swiss football
2015 in Swiss sport
2016 in Swiss sport